Ophiusa hituense is a moth of the family Erebidae. It is endemic to Australia and is found in Queensland.

The wingspan is 50–60 mm.

Gallery

External links
 Australian Caterpillars
 Pest and Diseases Images Library

Ophiusa
Moths described in 1884